The Fighting Creek Plantation is a historic plantation house at 1811 Mill Quarter Road in Powhatan, Virginia.  It is one of a few surviving mid-19th century plantation houses in the state.  The two story stucco manor house was built c. 1841, supposedly to a design by New York architect Alexander Jackson Davis.  It was built for John Brockenbrough Harvie and his wife as the main house of their nearly  plantation.  The property now associated with the house has been reduced to just .  Its main facade features a two-story portico with square Doric columns, topped by a pedimented gable.  On each level under the portico there is a door, with round-arch windows flanking it on either side.

The property was added to the National Register of Historic Places in 2013.

See also
National Register of Historic Places listings in Powhatan County, Virginia

References

Houses on the National Register of Historic Places in Virginia
Neoclassical architecture in Virginia
Houses completed in 1841
Houses in Powhatan County, Virginia
National Register of Historic Places in Powhatan County, Virginia